Wysswasser power station is a small hydroelectric powerstation in the village of Fiesch, Switzerland. It yields 8.2 GWh per year

References

Hydroelectric power stations in Switzerland